Shag Rock is a small rocky island in the Wallabi Group of the Houtman Abrolhos.

Geography
It is uninhabited, and devoid of human infrastructure.

This island should not be confused with the rocky island that lies to the west of North Island. The latter has no gazetted name, but is informally known as "Shag Rock".

Geology and physiography
Shag Rock is essentially an outcrop of Wallabi Limestone, a dense calcretised, coral limestone platform that underlies the entire Wallabi Group. Reef that formed during the Eemian Stage (about 125,000 years ago), when sea levels were higher than at present, are now emergent in places, and constitute the basement of the group's "central platform" islands, of which Shag Island is one.

Flora

About half of the island, including most of its centre, is rock with no vegetation cover. A very small area just south of the centre is vegetated by Tecticornia halocnemoides (Shrubby Samphire). The remainder of the island, predominantly the northern third and a patch in the south west, is vegetated by Atriplex cinerea (Grey Saltbush), Nitraria billardierei (Nitre Bush) and Pittosporum phillyreoides (Weeping Pittosporum).

References

Wallabi Group
Uninhabited islands of Australia